General Gardner may refer to:

Donald R. Gardner (fl. 1950s–1990s), U.S. Marine Corps major general
Franklin Gardner (1823–1873), Confederate States Army major general
Grandison Gardner (1892–1973), U.S. Air Force major general
John D. Gardner (fl. 2000s), U.S. Army lieutenant general
William M. Gardner (1824–1901), Confederate States Army brigadier general

See also
General Gardiner (disambiguation)